Discover, stylized as DisCover on the cover, is the debut album by Serbian rock band Cactus Jack.

The album was recorded on the band's concert held on 23 December 2001 in the Coupe club in their hometown Pančevo. It features 19 covers of songs by various rock acts. The album features two bonus tracks, "Hard to Handle" and "Tush", with Dragoljub "Paja" Bogdanović as guest vocalist. Bogdanović, who would in 2015 become Cactus Jack's frontman, was at the time member of the band Beer Drinkers & Hell Raisers.

Track listing

Bonus tracks

Personnel
Vladimir Jezdimirović - vocals
Stevan Birak - guitar
Miodrag Krudulj - bass guitar
Dušan Gnjidić - drums

Additional personnel
Dragoljub "Paja" Bogdanović - vocals (on tracks: 18, 19)
Moma Cvetković - producer
Zoltan Totka - photography

References

DisCover at Discogs

External links
DisCover at Discogs

Cactus Jack (band) live albums
Covers albums
2002 live albums
One Records (Serbia) live albums